Rildene Fonseca Firmino (born 1974) is a retired Brazilian Paralympic swimmer who competed at international elite competitions, she is a double Parapan American Games champion and a two-time World bronze medalist.

Disability
Firmino and her cousin Ivanildo Fonseca, both aged six at the time, were involved in a shooting incident. Fonseca got a hold of Firmino's grandfather's .38 caliber revolver and was play shooting the gun with Firmino, the gun had a single bullet in the drum and Firmino was shot in the T11 vertebra and it exited her right lung. Her injuries were so severe that she had near-fatal lung and liver complications and spent three days recovering in an intensive care unit at a nearby hospital. She was left with life-changing injuries and was paraplegic for the rest of her life.

References

1974 births
Living people
People from Natal, Rio Grande do Norte
Paralympic swimmers of Brazil
Swimmers at the 1992 Summer Paralympics
Swimmers at the 2004 Summer Paralympics
Swimmers at the 2008 Summer Paralympics
Swimmers at the 2016 Summer Paralympics
Medalists at the 2003 Parapan American Games
Medalists at the 2007 Parapan American Games
Medalists at the 2015 Parapan American Games
Medalists at the World Para Swimming Championships
Shooting survivors
Date of birth missing (living people)
Brazilian female breaststroke swimmers
Brazilian female medley swimmers
Brazilian female backstroke swimmers
S5-classified Paralympic swimmers
Sportspeople from Rio Grande do Norte
20th-century Brazilian women
21st-century Brazilian women